The zapateado is a group of dance styles of Mexico, 
characterized by a lively rhythm punctuated by the striking of the dancer's shoes, akin to tap dance. The name derives from the Spanish word zapato for "shoe": zapatear means to strike with a shoe. It is widely used in sones, huapangos and chilenas.

The term is also used to refer to percussive footwork in some Spanish/Latin dances that involve elaborate shoe clicking and tapping and to the percussion music produced by shoe striking.

See also
 Zapateado (Spain)

References

David Ewen, Encyclopedia of Concert Music. New York: Hill and Wang, 1959.  

Dance in Mexico
Uses of shoes